Konstantinos Roubesis (born 1894, date of death unknown) was a Greek athlete. He competed in the men's pentathlon at the 1920 Summer Olympics.

References

1894 births
Year of death missing
Athletes (track and field) at the 1920 Summer Olympics
Greek pentathletes
Olympic athletes of Greece
Place of birth missing